Lt Gen. Darrell K. Williams, is an American U.S. Army military leader and university president. He served as a general officer in the United States Army directing the Defense Logistics Agency until July 8, 2020. He was previously the Commanding General, Combined Arms Support Command, the Sustainment Center of Excellence (SCoE) as well as the Senior Mission Commander for Fort Lee, Virginia. He currently oversees the Logistics Commodities and Services Transformation Program on behalf of the United Kingdom's Ministry of Defence as a Leidos Vice President and managing director.  Williams is the founding chair of the Mary S. Peake Fellowship, a one-year program for next-generation leaders helping local businesses grow, named in honor of Mary S. Peake. 

On April 13, 2022, Hampton University announced Williams as the next president, succeeding William R. Harvey who became Hampton's president in 1978.

Early life

A native of West Palm Beach, Florida, Williams was commissioned into the Army Quartermaster Corps at Hampton Institute, Hampton, Virginia in 1983.  He was a Distinguished Military Graduate and also earned a Bachelor of Arts degree in Psychology. He also became a member of Gamma Iota chapter of Alpha Phi Alpha fraternity.

Military education 

His post graduate education includes: Master's degree in Military Arts and Sciences from the School of Advanced Military Studies, Fort Leavenworth, Kansas; Master's degree in National Security and Strategic Studies (Distinguished Graduate) from the National War College, Fort McNair, Washington D.C.; and master's degree in Business Management (Logistics) from the Pennsylvania State University, State College, PA in 1991.

Military career 

Williams has commanded logistics units at the company, battalion, brigade, and enterprise levels and has served in key staff positions at the tactical, operational/joint and strategic levels.  His prior assignments include: Deputy Chief of Staff, U.S. Army Materiel Command (AMC), Redstone Arsenal, Alabama; Commander, Defense Logistics Agency (DLA) Land and Maritime in Columbus, Ohio; Director of Logistics, Engineering and Security Assistance, J-4, Headquarters, United States Pacific Command (USPACOM), Hawaii; Executive Officer to the Army Deputy Chief of Staff, G-4 (Army G-4); Brigade Commander, 3d Sustainment Brigade, Fort Stewart, Georgia; and Deputy C-4, Coalition Forces Land Component Command (CFLCC), Camp Arifjan, Kuwait during Operations Enduring (OEF), Iraqi Freedom (OIF).

Williams previously commanded the 1st Sustainment Command (Theater) where he was responsible for providing theater sustainment to Army forces and elements of the Joint Force throughout the U.S. Central Command (USCENTCOM) Area of Responsibility, to include Afghanistan and Iraq, under the mission command of U.S. Army Central (USARCENT).

Awards and decorations

References

Year of birth missing (living people)
Living people
People from West Palm Beach, Florida
Hampton University alumni
Smeal College of Business alumni
United States Army Command and General Staff College alumni
National War College alumni
United States Army personnel of the Iraq War
United States Army personnel of the War in Afghanistan (2001–2021)
United States Army generals
Recipients of the Defense Superior Service Medal
Recipients of the Legion of Merit
Military personnel from Florida
Presidents of Hampton University